End of the Road is a 1944 American crime film directed by George Blair and written by Denison Clift, Gertrude Walker and Albert Beich. The film stars Edward Norris, John Abbott, June Storey, Jonathan Hale, Pierre Watkin and Ted Hecht. The film was released on November 10, 1944, by Republic Pictures.

Plot
Everybody dies

Cast
Edward Norris as Robert Kirby
John Abbott as Chris Martin
June Storey as Kitty McDougal
Jonathan Hale as Gregory McCune
Pierre Watkin as District Attorney
Ted Hecht as Walter Gribbon
Kenne Duncan as Al Herman
Eddie Fields as Joe Ferrari 
Ferris Taylor as Drake
Emmett Vogan as Mannenburg
Charles Williams as Jordan
Edward Van Sloan as Judge

References

External links 
 

1944 films
1940s English-language films
American crime films
1944 crime films
Republic Pictures films
Films directed by George Blair
American black-and-white films
1940s American films